Sherrys Prince was a racing greyhound during the late 1960s and early 1970s. He was three times winner of the Grand National and is considered the greatest hurdler of all time.

Early life
He was whelped in April 1967, by Mad Era out of Nevasca, owned by Joyce Matthews and trained out of West Ham Stadium by John Shevlin. The kennelhand was Irene Hazelwood later (McNally).

Racing career

1969
His last race on the flat was 9 May 1969 at New Cross Stadium before being schooled for hurdles by Shevlin at West Ham Stadium. He came to prominence after setting new hurdle track records at White City and Wembley.

1970
He dominated the 1970 Grand National at White City. He won his heat and semi final before winning the final on 18 April. He also won the Long Hop Hurdles at the same track during April. Unfortunately he broke a hock when finishing runner-up in the Scottish Grand National final, at Powderhall over 500 yards hurdles.

By October he had recovered and had returned to racing but his trainer John Shevlin's health was failing at the time. Shevlin died which resulted in his West Ham kennel being allocated to Colin West with McNally remaining to help the kennel.

1971
He won the New Year Hurdles at Wembley but was defeated by Derry Palm in the Supreme Hurdles Champion Stakes over 525 yards at White City.  In April he then equalled the record of Juvenile Classic and Blossom of Annagura, by winning a second Grand National title. He once again went unbeaten throughout the 1971 edition. The success included two track records in the heats and semi finals. He later set a world record in the final of the Wimbledon Gold Cup when recording 28.83 seconds.

1972
He won the Cobb Marathon hurdles on 5 February 1972, setting a new track record of 35.75 before being struck with a kidney infection. However, by April he had recovered and then rewrote the record books by becoming the first greyhound to win a third Grand National. The record was even more significant because he went unbeaten again for the third successive time. 
  
He retired after running in 105 hurdle races, winning 70 and finishing runner-up 15 times, in addition to setting 15 track records. He died in 1978.

Selected track records

Pedigree

References

Greyhound racing in the United Kingdom
Racing greyhounds
1967 animal births
1978 animal deaths